was a Japanese actor and dancer. He appeared in more than 40 films from 1954 to 1993.

Career
Born in Tokyo, Azuma attended the Tokyo University of the Arts, while studying Japanese dance under Bandō Mitsugorō VIII. He joined the Toei studio in 1954 and became a star after his debut film, Yukinojo henge, was a hit. His films with Yorozuya Kinnosuke, such as the "Fuefuki Dōji" and "Beni Kujaku" series, were some of the more popular works during the golden age of jidaigeki in the 1950s. After leaving Toei in 1965, Azuma concentrated on teaching dance while occasionally appearing in film and on stage and television.

Selected filmography

Shinsengumi Oni Taicho (1954)
Yukinojō henge - Fukushū no koi (1954) - Yukinojō Nakamura / Yamitarō
Yukinojō henge - Fukushū no mai (1954) - Yukinojō Nakamura / Yamitarō
Yukinojō henge - Fukushū no ken (1954) - Yukinojō Nakamura / Yamitarō
Shinshokoku monogatari: Fuefuki douji dai-ichi-bu dokuro no hata
Shinshokoku monogatari: Fuefuki douji dai-san-bu mangetsu-jō no gaika
Satomi Hakken-den: Dai-ichi-bu yōtō murasame maru (1954)
Satomi Hakken-den: Dai-ni-bu Hōryūkaku no ryūko (1954)
Satomi Hakken-den: Dai-san-bu kaibyō ranbu (1954)
Satomi Hakken-den: Dai-yon-bu ketsumei hakkenshi (1954)
Satomi Hakken-den: Kanketsu-hen akatsuki no kachidoki (1954)
Shinshokoku monogatari benikujaku 2: Noroi no mateki (1955)
Shinshokoku monogatari benikujaku 3: Tsuki no hakkotsu shiro (1955)
Ōedo senryō bayashi (1955)
Shinshokoku monogatari benikujaku 4: Kenmō ukinemaru (1955)
Shinshokoku monogatari benikujaku kanketsu-hen: Haikyo no hihō (1955)
Kaidan botan-dōrō (1955)
Yumiharizuki (1955)
Bijo to kairyu (1955)
Akō Rōshi: Ten no Maki, Chi no Maki (1956) - Takuminokami Asano
Kengō nitōryū (1956) - Sasaki Kojiro
Yūhi to kenjū (1956) - Rin'nosuke Date
Shinshokoku monogatari: Nanatsu no chikai kurosuisen no maki (1956)
Shinshokoku monogatari: Nanatsu no chikai doreisen no maki (1957)
Shinshokoku monogatari: Nanatsu no chikai gaisen uta no maki (1957)
Sasaki Kojiro (1957) - Sasaki Kojiro
Kaidan Banchō sara-yashiki (1957)
Mito kōmon (1957)
Sasaki Kojiro Kohen (1957) - Sasaki Kojiro
Ninkyō Shimizu-minato (1957) - Shichigoro
Junjō butai (1957)
Onmitsu Shichishoki (1958)
Ninkyo Tokaido (1958) - Hangoro
Hibari torimonocho: Kanzashi koban (1958) - Sasaki
Ninjutsu suikoden inazuma kotengu (1958)
Daibosatsu tōge - Dai ni bu (1958)
Ōedo shichininshū (1958)
Utamatsuri kanzashi matoi (1958)
Daibosatsu tōge - Kanketsu-hen (1959)
Hibari torimonochō: furisode koban (1959)
Tatsumaki bugyō (1959)
Kurama Tengu (1959)
Futari wakagishi (1959)
Beni-dasuki kenkajo (1959)
Mito Komon 3: All Star Version (1960)
Tenpō rokkasen - Jigoku no hanamichi (1960) - Ichinojō Kaneko
Hibari torimonochō: orizuru kago (1960)
Yatarō gasa (1960) - Magistrate Kuwayama
Suronin hyakuman-goku (1960)
Abare kago (1960)
Akō Rōshi (1961) - Horibe
Hangyakuji (1961)
Yurei-jima no okite (1961)
Wakasama yakuza (1961)
Kisaragi musō ken (1962) - Yoshimune Tokugawa
Chiisakobe (1962) - Washichi
Yoi-dore musoken (1962)
Hibari Chiemi no Yaji Kita Dochu (1963)
Seventeen Ninja (1963) - Bunzo Minuma
Kutsukake Tokijiro - yukyo ippiki (1966)
Kindaichi Kosuke no boken (1979) - Kojuro Akechi
Battle Fever J (1979-1980, TV Series) - General Tetsuzan Kurama
Sanada Taiheiki (1985) - Yagyū Munetoshi
Jipangu (1990) - Ieyasu Tokugawa
Anego - Gokudō wo aishita onna: Kiriko (1993) - Wakasa (final film role)

References

External links
 

1926 births
2000 deaths
Artists from Tokyo
Japanese male film actors
Japanese male television actors
Tokyo University of the Arts alumni
Japanese male dancers